Hanna Nifantava (born  17 October 1999) is a Belarusian speed skater. She competed at the 2022 Winter Olympics, in Women's 500 metres.

She competed at the 2016 Winter Youth Olympics, 2021 European Speed Skating Championships, and 2021 World Single Distances Speed Skating Championships.

References

External links 

1999 births
Living people
Belarusian female speed skaters
Olympic speed skaters of Belarus
Speed skaters at the 2022 Winter Olympics
Speed skaters at the 2016 Winter Youth Olympics
21st-century Belarusian women